Genuin may refer to:

 Angelo Genuin (b. 1939), Italian ski mountaineer and cross-country skier
 Magda Genuin (b. 1979), Italian cross country skier
 GENUIN classics, the name of a Leipzig-based classical music label